William Portman was an English politician who served as the Member of Parliament for Taunton in various parliaments during the late 14th and early 15th centuries. He was a significant landowner in Taunton, and also served as a tax collector in the town.

Life and career
William Portman was the son of Richard Portman and his wife Christine. One of his ancestors had previously served in Parliament during the reign of Edward I, and his parents owned twelve or more messuages in Taunton. Portman was first returned as a Member of Parliament for Taunton in 1362, the 37th Parliament of Edward III. He was returned on and off eleven times in total, spanning over 40 years, gaining election for the final time in 1406, to the 6th Parliament of Henry IV. He married Alice Crosse, and had one son, Walter Portman, who later served as the Member of Parliament for Taunton himself.

Portman served as a tax collector in Taunton in 1384, 1385, 1402 and 1406. He died around 1413, and was buried in Taunton Priory.

References

14th-century births
1410s deaths
English MPs 1362
English MPs 1372
English MPs 1379
English MPs January 1380
English MPs November 1384
English MPs 1385
English MPs 1386
English MPs February 1388
English MPs 1391
English MPs 1402
English MPs 1406